Wladyslaw Ossowski (born 5 November 1925 in the village of Iwaszkowce near Turka, Poland, died 5 August 2000 in Legnica), was a Polish boyscout and member of the White Couriers.

Using pseudonyms Maly Wladzio, Smyk, and Pitolcio Ossowski, as a 14-year-old boy, began leading Polish escapees from Soviet-occupied Eastern Poland. Between late 1939 and mid-1940, Ossowski, together with a group of Polish scouts mostly from Lwow, led scores of people across Soviet-Hungarian border (see: Molotov-Ribbentrop Pact) in the Eastern Carpathians. He would lead to Budapest those Poles who wanted to escape Soviet occupation. From Hungary, he would bring newspapers and directives of General Wladyslaw Sikorski. Ossowski, who was born and raised in the borderland area (before the war, there had been the Polish - Czechoslovakian border), used his knowledge and skills.

On 8 May 1940 Ossowski was arrested in a house in the village of Komarniki, on the way to Hungary. At first, he was transported to a military prison in Drohobycz, but the trial of the whole group of couriers took place in Lwow. Ossowski was sentenced to death, but due to his young age (14 at the time), the sentence was changed into 30 years of hard labor. He was taken to a Gulag in Siberia and his nationality was changed from Polish to Ukrainian, which made it impossible for him to return to Poland in latter years.  
Ossowski was released in 1955 and settled in Krasnoyarsk. In the following years, he was arrested multiple times and his adventures were described in a book written by Marek Celt. Despite living in Soviet Union for several decades, he never forgot the Bałak jargon of the Polish language.

In 1991 Ossowski and his family were accidentally found and next year they returned to Poland, after 52 years spent in Siberia. At first he settled in Szczecin, where he tried to run a pizzeria, given to him by a generous person. He frequently met local boyscouts, telling them about his adventures. Some time in late 1990s, Ossowski moved to Legnica, where he died.

See also 
Political repression in the Soviet Union
Rudolf Regner

Further reading 
 Celt, Marek (1986). Biali Kurierzy. Wydawnictwo LTW, Dziekanow Lesny. 
 Szatsznajder, Jan (1994). Dopisany Zyciorys... Wlawa Ossowskiego. Wyd. "W kolorach teczy", Wroclaw
 IPN: Polskie Podziemie 1939-1941. Od Wolynia do Pokucia. cz. 2, Warszawa-Kijow 2004, Wyd. Rytm, str. 1221–1319.

1925 births
2000 deaths
Polish resistance members
Nonpersons in the Eastern Bloc
Polish deportees to Soviet Union
Polish people detained by the NKVD
Foreign Gulag detainees
People from Lviv Oblast